Avram is a male given name. It is a form of the name Abram, which means exalted father.

The following people share this name:

Abraham, the founding patriarch of the Israelites, Ishmaelites, Midianites and Edomite peoples
Avram Bunaciu (1909–1983), Romanian communist politician
Avram Noam Chomsky (born 1928), American linguist and political activist
Avram Davidson (1923–1993), American Jewish writer
Avram Finkelstein, Jewish American artist
Avram Glazer (born 1960), Jewish American businessperson
Avram Grant (born 1955), Israeli association football manager
Avram Hershko (born 1937), Israeli Nobel laureate biochemist
Avram Iancu (1824–1872), Transylvanian Romanian lawyer
Avram Petronijević (1791–1852), Serbian politician

References

Notes

Sources
Н. А. Петровский (N. A. Petrovsky). "Словарь русских личных имён" (Dictionary of Russian First Names). ООО Издательство "АСТ". Москва, 2005. 

Hebrew masculine given names
Romanian masculine given names
Russian masculine given names
Serbian masculine given names
